Florent Caers (born 17 November 1928) is a Belgian rower. He competed in the men's coxless four event at the 1952 Summer Olympics.

References

1928 births
Living people
Belgian male rowers
Olympic rowers of Belgium
Rowers at the 1952 Summer Olympics
Sportspeople from Antwerp